Girls Like Nicole is the debut album by Swedish recording artist Rebstar. It was released on June 3, 2016 by Today Is Vintage. The album contains elements of hip hop, psychedelic pop and indie rock.

Track listing

Personnel
 Executive produced by Rebstar
 Photography: Linus Morales, Eric Dahlerus
 Artwork direction by Rebstar
 Artwork design by Eric Dahlerus
 Engineered by Rebstar, Saint
 Mixed by Markus Harju
 Mastered by Björn Engelmann for Cutting Room

References

2016 debut albums
Rebstar albums